The Applegate Valley AVA is an American Viticultural Area located in southern Oregon. It is entirely contained within the Rogue Valley AVA, which is itself included within the larger Southern Oregon AVA. The region is named for the Applegate River, which flows through the town of Applegate and near the city of Jacksonville. The Applegate Valley has been a grape-growing region since 1870 when A. H. Carson began planting 30 acres of grapes along North Applegate Road. One of Oregon's first wineries (the winery has been restored and re-opened as Valley View Winery) was established in the Applegate Valley.
Grapes that thrive here include Tempranillo, Merlot, Cabernet Franc, Cabernet Sauvignon, Syrah, Tannat, Vermentino, Chardonnay, and Zinfandel.

References

External links
 The Applegate Wine Trail 

American Viticultural Areas
Oregon wine
Geography of Jackson County, Oregon
Geography of Josephine County, Oregon
2000 establishments in Oregon